The Poor Relief Act 1691 (3 Will & Mary c 11) was an Act of the Parliament of England.

The whole Act was repealed by section 245(1) of, and Schedule 11 to, the Poor Law Act 1927.

Sections 1 to 4 (which are sections 2 to 5 in Ruffhead's Edition of the Statutes, by Serjeant Runnington, 1786) were repealed by section 1 of, and the Schedule to, the Statute Law Revision Act 1867.

Section 5
This section (which is section 6 in Ruffhead's Edition) was repealed by section 1 of, and the Schedule to, the Statute Law Revision Act 1867.

Section 6
This section (which is section 7 in Ruffhead's Edition) was repealed by section 1 of, and the Schedule to, the Statute Law Revision Act 1867.

Section 8
An attorney's clerk, articled by indenture, was an apprentice within the meaning of section 8 of the 3 & 4 Will & Mary c 11, and, as such, gained a settlement under this Act in the parish in which he inhabited while serving under his articles.

Section 11
This section was repealed by section 1 of, and the Schedule to, the Statute Law Revision Act 1887.

Section 12
This section was repealed by section 1 of, and the Schedule to, the Statute Law Revision Act 1867.

References
Halsbury's Statutes,

Acts of the Parliament of England
1691 in law
English Poor Laws